Stenoidion schmidi is a species of beetle in the family Cerambycidae. It was described by Martins and Galileo in 2009.

References

Neoibidionini
Beetles described in 2009